Koh Kong Airport  is a public use airport located near Koh Kong, Kaôh Kŏng, Cambodia.

See also
List of airports in Cambodia

References

External links 
 Airport record for Koh Kong Airport at Landings.com

Airports in Cambodia
Buildings and structures in Koh Kong province
Koh Kong province